The arrondissement of Tours is an arrondissement of France in the Indre-et-Loire department in the Centre-Val de Loire region. It has 54 communes.

Composition

The communes of the arrondissement of Tours, and their INSEE codes, are:

 Artannes-sur-Indre (37006)
 Azay-le-Rideau (37014)
 Azay-sur-Cher (37015)
 Ballan-Miré (37018)
 Berthenay (37025)
 Bréhémont (37038)
 Chambray-lès-Tours (37050)
 Chançay (37052)
 Chanceaux-sur-Choisille (37054)
 La Chapelle-aux-Naux (37056)
 Cheillé (37067)
 Druye (37099)
 Esvres (37104)
 Fondettes (37109)
 Joué-lès-Tours (37122)
 Larçay (37124)
 Lignières-de-Touraine (37128)
 Luynes (37139)
 La Membrolle-sur-Choisille (37151)
 Mettray (37152)
 Monnaie (37153)
 Montbazon (37154)
 Montlouis-sur-Loire (37156)
 Monts (37159)
 Notre-Dame-d'Oé (37172)
 Parçay-Meslay (37179)
 Pont-de-Ruan (37186)
 Reugny (37194)
 La Riche (37195)
 Rigny-Ussé (37197)
 Rivarennes (37200)
 Rochecorbon (37203)
 Saché (37205)
 Saint-Avertin (37208)
 Saint-Branchs (37211)
 Saint-Cyr-sur-Loire (37214)
 Sainte-Catherine-de-Fierbois (37212)
 Saint-Étienne-de-Chigny (37217)
 Saint-Genouph (37219)
 Saint-Pierre-des-Corps (37233)
 Savonnières (37243)
 Sorigny (37250)
 Thilouze (37257)
 Tours (37261)
 Truyes (37263)
 Vallères (37264)
 Veigné (37266)
 Véretz (37267)
 Vernou-sur-Brenne (37270)
 Villaines-les-Rochers (37271)
 Villandry (37272)
 La Ville-aux-Dames (37273)
 Villeperdue (37278)
 Vouvray (37281)

History

The arrondissement of Tours was created in 1800. At the January 2017 reorganisation of the arrondissements of Indre-et-Loire, it gained 12 communes from the arrondissement of Chinon, and it lost 34 communes to the arrondissement of Chinon and 46 communes to the arrondissement of Loches.

As a result of the reorganisation of the cantons of France which came into effect in 2015, the borders of the cantons are no longer related to the borders of the arrondissements. The cantons of the arrondissement of Tours were, as of January 2015:

 Amboise
 Ballan-Miré
 Bléré
 Chambray-lès-Tours
 Château-la-Vallière
 Château-Renault
 Joué-lès-Tours-Nord
 Joué-lès-Tours-Sud
 Luynes
 Montbazon
 Montlouis-sur-Loire
 Neuillé-Pont-Pierre
 Neuvy-le-Roi
 Saint-Avertin
 Saint-Cyr-sur-Loire
 Saint-Pierre-des-Corps
 Tours-Centre
 Tours-Est
 Tours-Nord-Est
 Tours-Nord-Ouest
 Tours-Ouest
 Tours-Sud
 Tours-Val-du-Cher
 Vouvray

References

Tours